Sukhminder "Sukh" Singh Dhaliwal  (born October 1, 1960) is a Canadian businessman and politician, who has served as the Liberal Member of Parliament for Surrey—Newton since 2015. He was previously the Member of Parliament for Newton—North Delta from 2006 to 2011.

Early life 
Born in Sujapur, Punjab, India, Dhaliwal emigrated from India in 1999 and became canadian citizen three years later. As a businessman, he co-founded a successful land surveying company and played an important role in the municipal politics of Surrey where he is said to have dominated the Surrey Electors Team membership list by signing up over 2,600 new party members. This represented over half the total number of members. However, in the November 1999 municipal elections, Dhaliwal lost his own bid for a seat on city council.

Federal politics 
Dhaliwal was the federal Liberal candidate for the Newton-North Delta riding in 2004, but lost to Conservative Gurmant Grewal by just over 500 votes. Grewal decided to not seek re-election and, in 2006, Dhaliwal faced Conservative newcomer Phil Eidsvik. The NDP was also strong in the riding and 2004 candidate Nancy Clegg also ran again. Dhaliwal succeeded in winning the seat by exactly 1,000 votes.

In the 2006 Liberal leadership campaign, Dhaliwal initially indicated support for Joe Volpe, but soon moved to support Michael Ignatieff. Dhaliwal was instrumental in building support for Ignatieff's campaign in the Sikh community. Dhaliwal played a key role in Ignatieff’s short-lived, but successful, second leadership campaign in 2008.

Dhaliwal in 2008 had written to a U.S. District Court judge on official House of Commons stationery in support of convicted international drug trafficker Ranjit Singh Cheema.

On October 14, 2008, Dhaliwal was re-elected to Parliament by nearly 2,500 votes. Following the election, Dhaliwal was elected as the Chair of the Northern and Western Caucus of the Liberal Party, and served as the critic for the Asia Pacific Gateway and Western Economic Diversification Canada.

Dhaliwal has served on several House of Commons Committees: International Trade; Transportation, Infrastructure and Communities; and Access to Information, Privacy and Ethics. The Ethics Committee attracted high profile attention when it investigated allegations surrounding Karlheinz Schreiber’s dealings with former Prime Minister Brian Mulroney.

Dhaliwal lost his seat to Jinny Sims of the New Democratic Party in the 2011 federal election.

After a BC Liberal Party review of his candidacy, he eventually decided to withdraw from running in the provincial election after he was charged with six counts of tax evasion and convicted of 3 counts for his business that he runs with his wife. Balwinder Kaur Dhaliwal (nicknamed herself "Roni"), a Surrey bylaw officer, who was charged with 14 offences and convicted of 6 counts of tax evasion under the Criminal Code of Canada.

In December 2014, Dhaliwal won the Liberal nomination in newly-formed riding of Surrey—Newton ahead of the 2015 election. He defeated NDP incumbent Jinny Sims and won the seat with 56 per cent of the vote.

In 2021, in the Lakhimpur Kheri massacre in India, 8 people died in a vehicle-ramming attack. Shaken by the video of the incident Dhaliwal called it a terror attack no different than London, Ontario truck attack.

Electoral record

References

External links
Sukh Dhaliwal
 
 Vancouver Sun International Drug Trafficker Letter

1960 births
Businesspeople from British Columbia
Canadian engineers
Canadian Sikhs
Indian emigrants to Canada
Liberal Party of Canada MPs
Living people
Members of the House of Commons of Canada from British Columbia
People from Ludhiana district
People from Surrey, British Columbia
Canadian politicians of Punjabi descent
Canadian politicians of Indian descent
21st-century Canadian politicians